Wacławowo is also the name of a district of Avondale, Chicago.

Wacławowo  is a village in the administrative district of Gmina Wilczyn, within Konin County, Greater Poland Voivodeship, in west-central Poland.

References

Villages in Konin County